Elias Dumaresq, 5th Seigneur of Augres was born in 1674 and was a Seigneur of Augres located in the parish of Trinity, Jersey, the largest of the Channel Islands,  He belonged to the influential Dumaresq family.

Biography 
Elias Dumaresq  was the son of, Elias Dumaresq, 4th Seigneur of Augres (1648–1734) and Frances De Carteret, daughter of Sir Francis de Carteret, Attorney-General of Jersey (1619–1693) and Anne Seale (1641–1703) and thus the grandchild of Sir Philippe de Carteret II, Bailiff and Lieut-Governor of Jersey through his maternal grandfather.

Elias Dumaresq and his wife Elizabeth de Carteret resided at the Les Augrès Manor, what had been in the Dumaresq family since the mid-16th century.  Elias continued to live at the manor even though it with in the Fief de Diélament not the Fief des Augrès. As Elias was the Seigneur of the Fief des Augrès, the manor became known as Les Augrès Manor.

The Manor is depicted on the 2010 issue Jersey 5 pound note and now forms the headquarters of the Durrell Wildlife Conservation Trust (formerly Jersey Wildlife Preservation Trust)

Elie Dumaresq's estate became the subject of bankruptcy procedures in 1734.

Family 
Elias married Elizabeth de Carteret (died 1765), daughter of Sir Amice De Carteret (1635–1703), and his wife Sarah Dumaresq (1643–1707) They had issue:

 Rev. Daniel Dumaresq FRS ( Educational consultant to Catherine the Great (1762–96) of Russia and Stanislaus II (1764–95) King of Poland),
 John Dumaresq (1705–1747) m. Deborah Dumaresq,
 Jane Anne Dumaresq (1733–1806) m. Elias Le Maistre,
 Deborah Dumaresq (1744–1802),
 Michael Dumaresq (1706– ),
 Philip Dumaresq (1708– ),
 Edward Dumaresq (1710– ),
 Elizabeth Dumaresq (1713– ) m. John de Carteret,
 Elias Dumaresq (1715– ),
 Rachel Dumaresq (1717– ),
 George Dumaresq (1719– )

Ancestry

References 

1674 births
1754 deaths
Jersey people